Joshua Robert Rawlings (born December 10, 1982 in St. Croix Falls, Wisconsin) is an American pianist, songwriter and record producer. His band, The Teaching, wrote and recorded a song "Bom Bom" for the Macklemore album The Heist, which became the most successful instrumental single on that multiple GRAMMY winning album.  Josh earned his first GRAMMY nomination for his contributions on that album.

Rawlings' critically acclaimed work with the Seattle jazz group Industrial Revelation has yielded numerous accolades and awards including a "Seattle Stranger Genius Award". Rawlings joined with the soulful singer "Allen Stone" for his 2013-14 US Tour   The Josh Rawlings Trio released their album Swell at a launch party at Bake's Place in Bellevue, Washington, in November 2016, and he had an extensive interview published about his life and career thus far in the digital entertainment magazine WE BLAB article, Producer Josh Rawlings talks Macklemore's The Heist, and being nominated for a Grammy

Early life
Rawlings was born in St. Croix Falls, Wisconsin, USA, to Charlene Linnae, a former chef and business owner and Todd Robert Rawlings, a patented Inventor and senior Quality Engineer at Microsoft. Josh started playing piano at age 3, listening to the radio and figuring out songs on his mini-keyboard. His parents were both vocalists and actors in school and his father was also a percussionist.  They taught Josh the fundamentals of music and rhythm and encouraged his music and play acting. Rawlings lived in and around the greater Twin Cities, Minnesota through sixth grade before moving to the Seattle, Washington area in 1997.  He attended Skyline High School in Issaquah, Washington where he composed music for the school's Alma Mater; he later attended Cornish College of the Arts in Seattle, Washington, graduating with a Bachelor of Music in Jazz Performance in 2005.

Music career
Josh has played professionally in the Seattle area since 2001 and is a Band Leader for the Josh Rawlings Trio, a member of The Teaching, a member of Seattle’s powerhouse Rock/Jazz group Industrial Revelation, (a band who recently played Teatro Manzoni in Milan, Italy to a crowd of over 800 fans), as well as a recording artist for Macklemore and Ryan Lewis. Josh was interviewed in 2017 about his career and relationship with Ryan Lewis on the Seattle Jazz Radio website, KEXP.org.

Awards 

 Seattle Earshot Golden Ear Award 2013
 Seattle Stranger Newspaper 2014 Genius Music Award
 Grammy Award Nomination: for his work and track "Bom Bom" on the Macklemore and Ryan Lewis album The Heist, in 2014. The Heist went on to win Best Rap Album of the year, with Macklemore and Ryan Lewis also winning Best New Artists. 
 Platinum Album Award (as a contributing artist): The Macklemore album The Heist was certified platinum or better by the RIAA and has received numerous GRAMMY awards.
 Platinum Single Award: Rawlings' contributions on the song "Downtown" for the Macklemore and Ryan Lewis album This Unruly Mess I've Made was certified platinum or better by the RIAA.

Discography

Albums

 Climbing Stairs Josh Rawlings Trio (2005)
 The Teaching The Teaching (2009)
 Live at Dazzle The Teaching (2010)
 Live at the Triple Door The Teaching (2010)
 Birds in Flight The Teaching (2014)
 It Can Only Get Better From Here Industrial Revelation
 Unreal Reality Industrial Revelation
 Live at the Eastside Industrial Revelation
 Oak Head Industrial Revelation
 Live at Rhythm and Rye Industrial Revelation
 Liberation & the Kingdom of Nri Industrial Revelation
 Additional Discography at AllMusic.com

Singles
 "Marmalade" (2017) on the GEMINI album.
 "Downtown"  August 27, 2015, on the This Unruly Mess I've Made album.

Productions
 Macklemore - "Bom Bom" (2012) with Josh's band, The Teaching, on The Heist album. GEMINI album (2017).
 Macklemore and Ryan Lewis - This Unruly Mess I've Made (2016).

References

External links
 
 

1982 births
Musicians from Seattle
Living people